The 2015 FKF President's Cup (known as the GOtv Shield for sponsorship reasons) was the 44th season of Kenya's top domestic cup competition. It kicked off on 20 June and concluded on 13 December, with the domestic broadcasting rights for the competition held by SuperSport. Originally scheduled to begin on 6 June, participating teams were required to pay a registration fee of KSh.  each by 30 May to enter the tournament. The competition's defending champions are Sofapaka, who beat second-tier side Posta Rangers 2–1 in the previous final. Unlike the previous competition, no teams were seeded and given byes to further rounds, with the Football Kenya Federation's media officer John Kariuki explaining the decision as a way of "trying to make the competition more exciting because this being the domestic cup competition, we want the thrill of big teams facing the prospect of losing in the hands of lower-ranked teams."

Kenyan Premier League side Bandari beat second-tier Nakumatt 4–2 in the final to win their first ever title. They received  in prize money and will represent Kenya in the preliminary round of the 2016 CAF Confederation Cup.

Teams

First round
The draw for the first round was held on 9 June.

Teams withdrawing from the competition
For various reasons, eight teams pulled out of the first round to reduce the original number of teams from 72 to 64. Of the eight, three compete in the Kenyan Premier League, another four in the FKF Premier League, another and one in the National Super League.

 Agrochemical (2)
 Chemelil Sugar (1)
 Kenya Methodist University (3)
 Mathare United (1)
 Oserian (2)
 St. Joseph (2)
 Top Fry AllStars (1)
 Zoo Kericho (2)

Fixtures
The first round ties were played from 20 June to 15 August. 64 teams from the entire Kenyan football league system as well as non-league teams began their campaigns at this stage.

Nairobi County failed to show up for the match. APS Bomett advance to the second round.

Chemelil Sugar withdrew from the tournament. Bondo United advance to the second round.

Both teams withdrew from the tournament.

Oserian withdrew from the tournament. Fortune SACCO advance to the second round.

Bracket

Second round
The second round ties were played from 25 August to 20 September. On 19 September, Thika United announced their withdrawal from the tournament, claiming they were not supposed to be paired against Sony Sugar in the second round.

Thika United withdrew from the tournament. Sony Sugar advance to the third round.

Third round
The third round was scheduled to be played on the weekend of 10–11 October, but the match between Gor Mahia and Palos was pushed back to 14 October while the match between A.F.C. Leopards and Ulinzi Stars was pushed back to 21 October.

Muhoroni Youth vs. Police abandonment
During the match between Premier League side Muhoroni Youth and National Super League side Police, a penalty was awarded in the 85th minute after Police player David Okiki committed a handball inside his own penalty area. Just before the penalty was taken, an assistant coach from the Police bench ran onto the pitch and physically assaulted the referee, prompting the match to be halted for nearly 30 minutes before eventually being abandoned. Muhoroni Youth were subsequently awarded the win and advanced to the quarter-finals.

Fixtures

The match was abandoned in the 85th minute. Muhoroni Youth awarded the win and advance to quarter-finals.

Quarter-finals
The draw for the quarter-finals was conducted on 15 October. Fixtures took place from 7–20 November.

Semi-finals
The draw for the semi-finals was conducted on 5 December, with the dates and venues for the third place play-off and the final also confirmed. Fixtures took place on 15 November and 9 December.

Third place play-off
The third place play-off was scheduled to take place on 13 December. Muhoroni Youth were handed a walkover after Gor Mahia failed to show up for the match. Gor Mahia players reportedly boycotted the match over unpaid wages, and forfeited the KSh.  in prize money meant for the fourth-placed team in the process. The club's secretary-general Ronald Ngala later released a statement saying Gor Mahia would not participate in future editions of the tournament until he saw an improvement in the way it is run.

Gor Mahia failed to show up for the match. Muhoroni Youth win by default.

Final
The final took place on 13 December.

References

FKF President's Cup seasons
cup
2015 domestic association football cups